Cecil Copping (6 July 1888 in Lisbon, New Hampshire, United States – 4 January 1966 in Los Angeles, California, United States) was an American composer of film music and a miscellaneous crew. He composed background music to nine movies and worked as a miscellaneous crew in five movies in 1920s-1930s.

Biography

Partial filmography
The Hunchback of Notre Dame (1923)
The Sea Hawk (1924)
The Lost World (1925)
The Private Life of Helen of Troy (1927)
Chicago (1927)
The Patent Leather Kid (1927)
Lilac Time (1928)
The Divine Lady (1928)
Glad Rag Doll (1929)
The Hottentot (1929)
Her Private Life (1929)
The Isle of Lost Ships (1929)
Drag (1929)
The Love Racket (1929)
Loose Ankles (1930)
Misbehaving Ladies (1931)
Gone with the Wind (1939)

References

External links 

American film score composers
American male film score composers
1888 births
1966 deaths
People from Lisbon, New Hampshire
20th-century American male musicians